The 1929 Hollywood Stars season, was the fourth season for the original Hollywood Stars baseball team. The team, which began in 1903 as the Sacramento Solons, moved to Hollywood in 1926 and played in the Pacific Coast League (PCL). 

The 1929 PCL season ran from March 26 to October 7, 1929. The Stars, led by manager Ossie Vitt, finished third in the Pacific Coast League (PCL) with a 113–89 record. However, the PCL provided for a championship series to be played between the teams with best records in the first and second halves of the season. The Stars qualified for the championship series by compiling a 61–42 record in the second half of the season.

In the championship series, the Stars advanced to the championship series and defeated the Mission Reds, four games to three. On October 13, the Stars won the decisive Game 7 at Wrigley Field by an 8–3 score.

Pitcher Frank Shellenback led the Stars and the PCL with 26 wins. He pitched 335 innings and compiled a 26–12 record with a 3.98 earned run average (ERA) and 163 strikeouts. Augie Johns also pitched well, compiling a 17–10 record with a 3.90 ERA.

The team had five players who hit over .300 with at least 500 at bats. Right fielder Bill Rumler led the way with a .386 batting average, 26 home runs, and 120 RBIs.  The team's other top hitters were left fielder Liz Funk (.384 average, 13 home runs, 125 RBIs), first baseman Mickey Heath (.349 average, 38 home runs, 156 RBIs), center fielder Cleo Carlyle (.347 average, 20 home runs, 136 RBIs), and third baseman Red Rollings (.324 average, six home runs, 86 RBIs).

1929 PCL standings

Statistics

Batting 
Note: Pos = Position; G = Games played; AB = At bats; H = Hits; Avg. = Batting average; HR = Home runs; SLG = Slugging percentage; RBI = Runs batted in; SB = Stolen bases

Pitching 
Note: G = Games pitched; IP = Innings pitched; W = Wins; L = Losses; PCT = Win percentage; ERA = Earned run average; SO = Strikeouts

References

Further reading
 "The Greatest Minor League: A History of the Pacific Coast League, 1903-1957", by Dennis Snelling (McFarland 2011)

1929 in sports in California
Pacific Coast League seasons